Billie Jean Moffitt and Karen Susman were the defending champions, but Susman did not compete as she was expecting her first child. Moffitt partnered with Carole Caldwell but lost in the second round to Deidre Catt and Liz Starkie.

Maria Bueno and Darlene Hard defeated Robyn Ebbern and Margaret Smith in the final, 8–6, 9–7 to win the ladies' doubles tennis title at the 1963 Wimbledon Championships.

Seeds

  Robyn Ebbern /  Margaret Smith (final)
  Maria Bueno /  Darlene Hard (champions)
  Jan Lehane /  Lesley Turner (second round)
  Ann Jones /  Renée Schuurman (semifinals)

Draw

Finals

Top half

Section 1

Section 2

Bottom half

Section 3

Section 4

References

External links

Women's Doubles
Wimbledon Championship by year – Women's doubles
Wimbledon Championships
Wimbledon Championships